Chakravalam Chuvannappol is a 1983 Indian Malayalam-language drama film directed by J. Sasikumar. A remake of the Tamil-language film Keezh Vaanam Sivakkum (1981), the film stars Prem Nazir, Mohanlal, Mammootty, and Sumalatha. The film features music composed by M. K. Arjunan.

Plot

Menon is a doctor, whose only daughter, Latha, suffers from an incurable disease. He tries to conceal the same from her and his son-in-law, Suresh. One day a blind patient, Vasu,  comes to see Menon to restore his sight so that he can avenge the death of his only sister by her lover who duped her. The patient shows him the photo and Menon is shocked to see it is none other than Suresh.

His daughter is sympathetic to  the same patient and she set on seeing the photo. From then on it is a battle of wits between the father and daughter. Latha dies and her eyes are given to Vasu, who burns the photo of his sister's murderer.

Cast

Prem Nazir as Dr. Menon
Mammootty as Vasu
Mohanlal as Suresh
Sumalatha as Latha
Vanitha Krishnachandran as Prabha
Jagathy Sreekumar as Thalavakkuzhi
Baby Reena
Bindulekha
C. I. Paul as Dr. James
Kaval Surendran
Radhadevi

Soundtrack
The music was composed by M. K. Arjunan and the lyrics were written by Chirayinkeezhu Ramakrishnan Nair.

References

External links
 

1983 films
1980s Malayalam-language films
Malayalam remakes of Tamil films
Indian thriller films